Project Artemis is an upcoming American film directed by Greg Berlanti and written by Rose Gilroy. Setting as a 1960s space race film, it stars Scarlett Johansson, Channing Tatum, Jim Rash and Ray Romano. The film will be released on Apple TV+.

Cast
 Scarlett Johansson
 Channing Tatum
 Jim Rash
 Ray Romano
 Anna Garcia
 Colin Woodell
 Donald Elise Watkins
 Noah Robbins
 Nick Dillenburg
 Art Newkirk
 Ashley Kings
 Jonathan Orea Lopez
 Eva Pilar
 Christian Zuber
 Woody Harrelson
 Chad Crowe
 Will Jacobs
 Melissa Litow

Production
In March 2022, Apple TV+ announced it had acquired the distribution rights to the film for $100 million. Scarlett Johansson and Chris Evans were also announced as starring in the film, with Jason Bateman directing. In May, Bateman said the working title Project Artemis was likely to change. He left the project the following month, citing creative differences, and was later replaced by Greg Berlanti. The search for a new director and Berlanti's availability changed the production schedule, forcing Evans to drop out as well. In July, Channing Tatum entered negotiations to replace him. In September, Jim Rash joined the cast. Ray Romano, Anna Garcia and Woody Harrelson would be added in the following months.

Filming began on October 27, 2022, in Atlanta, with a casting call issued seeking extras to play NASA employees and FBI agents.

References

External links
 

Upcoming films
Films about space programs
Films about astronauts
Films about the United States Space Force
Films about NASA
Films about the Apollo program
Apple TV+ original films
Films directed by Greg Berlanti
Films shot in Atlanta